Jeux du Commerce West, JDC West Business Competition or informally, JDC West is an annual business competition featuring top business schools and students from across Western Canada, as well as the largest undergraduate business competition in Western Canada.  The first competition, hosted by UBC, occurred January 20-23, 2006, and attracted over 400 students. JDC West was modeled after Jeux du Commerce and allows the competition to move from host university/city to host university/city each given year.

Structure

Each university sends one team of 50+ representative students to participate respectively in one of 10 Academic Competitions, 1 Parliamentary Debate, 1 Athletic Competition or 1 Social Competition.  Points are awarded and accumulated towards a team being declared "School of the Year".

Academics

There are 10 core Academic Competitions. That being said, an organizing committee may add any number of additional academic cases, providing that the core academic cases (listed below) are included.  Each competition has 3 students from each team participate. In each case competition participants have a fixed amount of time to review the facts and prepare before presenting to the industry judges and experts. 

Current academic events for JDC West are:
 Accounting
 Business strategy
 Entrepreneurship 
 Finance 
 Human resource management 
 International business
 Business Technology Management 
 Marketing
 Not-for-profit business strategy (added in 2009)
 Taxation (removed for 2019)
 Operations management (added for 2019)

Debate

Each debate team has 4 students.  They have 30 minutes to review the proposal before presenting.  As it is in parliamentary style, one team is designated Team Government and the other Team Opposition.

Athletics

The hosting school chooses the sport each year. The teams include both male and female competitors. 

2006: Indoor Soccer (Futsal)
2007: Handball
2008: Dodgeball
2009: Volleyball, Westcoast Kickball, Inner Tube Water Polo, Relay (6 × 200)
2010: Indoor soccer played on two 190 x 90’ fields on FIFA-sanctioned Polytan artificial turf.
2011: Inner-tube water basketball & Ultimate Frisbee
2012: Flag football & Yukigassen
2013: Doctor Dodgeball & Netball
2014: Floor hockey & Tchoukball
2015: European handball & Schtick Disc
2016: Dodgeball & Floor ringette
2017: Korfball & DBL Ball
2018: Quidditch & Tchoukball
2019: Tsegball & D-Hoops
2020: Boccer & Circle-rules football
2021: No athletics due to Covid-19 restrictions
2022: (eSports) Rocket League

Social

Each social team has 4 students - two males and two females. The social portion of the JDC West competition is arguably the most arduous on its competitors who are on-call for ten social challenges to be completed in less than 48 hours at any time of day or night. These entertaining challenges are known to include spirit, mental and physical challenges that bring the 4 students together in a way no team sport could. These challenges test students adaptability, enthusiasm and team work to the extreme.

Additional awards

Participation - Focuses on the spirit of each school during the competition weekend. The team that cheers the hardest, shows up for the most events, and is the life of the party takes the prize.

Charity - Has two awards. One for the number of hours that school commits to their charities of choice and the second for the amount of dollars raised for their charity of choice.

Participating schools

The following schools are or have been participants in JDC West:

History of the Games

History of JDC and JDC West   
The original Jeux du Commerce, French for "Commerce Games" started as a Business Student Competition in 1989 in Eastern Canada. They were created in 1988 thanks to the initiative of some students of HEC MONTREAL who wanted to strengthen the links between the students of business administration through the province of Quebec. Mister Patrice Bourbonnais was the student heading a team of co-founders, including Patrick Bérard and Benoît Lessard, as well as others students. The School of Hautes Etudes Commerciales (French business school) of Montreal was the first institution host of the Games (Sets) of the Business in January, 1989.  Jeux du Commerce grew throughout the years and became one of the largest events hosted by REFAEC.  In 2003, Yannick Denis-Trudel, the president of REFAEC at the time had a vision to expand "the games" to the rest of Canada.  In an attempt to unify the country under the Jeux du Commerce banner, he took on the task of inviting a group of delegates from across Canada to visit the games and see what they were all about.  Students returned to their schools excited, but lacked a bit of direction in terms of establishing the games in their own regions.  The year after, Yannick made another attempt to get the rest of Canada excited about the games and created a competing team called "Team Rest of Canada" or "Team ROC".  The intention was to allow those visiting the games to actively take part in the games, rather than just watch from the sidelines.  Student's went back to their respective schools with an excitement to bring Jeux du Commerce to their respective regions.  At Roundtable 2005, one bid to host the event in the Western Region by students from the Sauder School of Business at the University of British Columbia, Co-Led by Jeff Potter and Nik Laufer-Edel.  Another bid was put forth for the Ontario region by Guelph Humber.  The Western bid was approved by the presidents of the western business schools of the Canadian Business School Council and allowed JDC West to take its first steps to be actualized.

In 2006, over 1,200 business students from 13 Eastern universities in Canada chose to compete. Since its inauguration, the JDC has become a prestigious annual event noted for its academic excellence and superior teamwork development.  Like JDC West, JDC consists of Athletic, Social, Debate and community involvement components. 

The JDC legacy expanded to Ontario schools in 2009, in a competition branded as JDC Central.
    
Following the success of 'Jeux du Commerce' a desire was expressed to create similar games in Western Canada, ultimately leading to a Commerce Competition on a national scale.  The Western Games were dubbed JDC West. JDC West has exemplified professionalism and excellence, while focusing on the unique challenges facing a Western Canadian business student.  The academic structure of the competition is maintained, encouraging students to strive for excellence and professionalism, while continuing the goodwill and good sportsmanship that JDC has been known for.

The JDC West Business Competition was incorporated as a not-for-profit in 2010 prior to JDC West 2011. In 2011, a volunteer Board of Directors was voted in by the Presidents of the participating business schools' students societies in collaboration with their JDC West Team Captains. This board is composed of active JDC West alumni and the current Organizing Committee's External Co-Chair. The board's main roles are to oversee the long-term strategy, risk mitigation, relationship management and high level financial health of the competition to ensure its long-term sustainability.

Competition venues

External links
 JDC West

Business plan competitions